Melrose is the thirty-ninth major release and twentieth studio album by Tangerine Dream.
This album was released in 1990 on the Private Music label founded by former Tangerine Dream member, Peter Baumann. The album further developed the instrumental pop style known from the previous two Private Music albums, Optical Race and Lily on the Beach. Edgar Froese's son, Jerome, for the first time appears on a Tangerine Dream album as a full-time member. This was Paul Haslinger's last album with Tangerine Dream.

Track listing 
All music by Edgar Froese and Paul Haslinger except where noted.

Personnel 
Tangerine Dream
 Edgar Froese – keyboards, lead guitar, rhythm guitar
 Jerome Froese – keyboards, lead guitar
 Paul Haslinger – keyboards
Guest musicians
 Hubert Waldner – saxophone on "Melrose"
Credits
 Jim Rakete – cover photos

References 

1990 albums
Tangerine Dream albums
Private Music albums